Erik Halvar Bertil Björk (22 September 1928 – 12 November 2000) was a Swedish actor. He worked at the Malmö City Theatre from 1962 till 1986, but also made many substantial film- and TV-roles; for example, he acted in Autumn Sonata (1978) and Sunday's Children (1992) by Ingmar Bergman and The Emigrants (1971) and The New Land (1972) by Jan Troell.

Björk won the Best Actor at the 5th Guldbagge Awards for his performance in the Yngve Gamlin film Badarna (1968). He died of lung cancer.

Filmography

References

External links

1928 births
2000 deaths
Swedish male film actors
Swedish male stage actors
Swedish male television actors
Best Actor Guldbagge Award winners
20th-century Swedish male actors
Deaths from lung cancer in Sweden
People from Ragunda Municipality